Puscanturpa (possibly from Quechua puchka, puska spindle, -n a suffix, t'urpu pointed, sharp,) is a mountain in the south of the Huayhuash mountain range in the Andes of Peru, about  high. It is located in the Huánuco Region, Lauricocha Province, Jesús District, and in the Lima Region, Cajatambo Province, Cajatambo District. Puscanturpa lies northwest of the lake and the mountain named Suerococha and northeast of Cuyoc.

References

Mountains of Peru
Mountains of Huánuco Region
Mountains of Lima Region